A Special operations firefighter, also known as Fire Service Special Operations, is a specialist firefighter who has been specially trained to execute tasks other than standard firefighting operations. The National Fire Protection Association's Standard for the Organization and Deployment of Fire Suppression Operations, Emergency Medical Operations, and Special Operations to the Public by Career Fire Departments (NFPA 1710) defines special operations as "Those emergency incidents to which the fire department responds that require specific and advanced training and specialized tools and equipment". The NFPA 1710 further defined special operations as "Special operations include water rescue, extrication, hazardous materials, confined space entry, high­angle rescue, aircraft rescue and fire fighting, and other operations requiring specialized training".

They are highly trained firefighters that do technical rescue operations. Special operations firefighters are intended to complement regular fire engine crews.

Types 

Each fire service department has its own types of special operations firefighters. In the United States, for example, the types vary from one fire department to another. The types of special operations vary according to a city's size or geographic location. Basically, types of special operations firefighters are as following:

 HAZMAT Squad
 Urban Search and Rescue Squad
 Air Operations Unit
 Dive Rescue Squad
 Underwater Search and Recovery Squad (also known as Dive Team)
 Marine Unit
 Bomb Squad
 Technical Rescue Squad
 High-angle Rescue Squad
 Extrication Squad
 Ice Rescue Squad
 Aircraft Rescue and Firefighting Squad
 Search and rescue Unit

History

1915-1930s 

The New York City Fire Department's (FDNY) Rescue Company No. 1 is the oldest special operations firefighters in modern firefighting history. On 8 March 1915, Rescue Company No. 1 was established. Rescue Company No. 1 began as a volunteer fire squad composed of volunteers from the ironworker, elevator man, and mason professions. During that time, their work description included "performing civilian and firefighter rescues at structural fires as well as operating at "odd jobs"". The Rescue Company No. 1 transformed into a squad that handles rope rescues as well as underwater search and recovery. Today, the FDNY Rescue Companies are now responsible for missions such as rope rescue, urban search and rescue, trench rescue, fire and explosion rescue, and elevator rescue.

1930s-1990 
The construction of high-rise structures was growing in the 1930s. This circumstance led to the establishment of new rescue squads or companies, not just by the FDNY but also by other fire departments, such as those in Boston. Later, more units with various specialisations were established. The New London School explosion occurred on 18 March 1937, in New London, Texas. The explosion was caused by natural gas, marking the beginning of HAZMAT operations.

1990-present 
The term "Fire Service Special Operations" was coined in 1990, when the FDNY unified all of its rescue companies, squad companies, marine units, TAC units (now known as FDNY Special Response Units), and HAZMAT units under one command. The command is known as the "Special Operations Command". Later, other fire departments began to refer to their special operations units as "special operations" units.

Roles 

According to the NFPA, special operations are a major service component of a fire department. Aside from special operations, other services include fire suppression, EMS, aircraft rescue and fire fighting, marine rescue and fire fighting, and/or wildland firefighting. Special operations are intended to complement conventional firefighting crews by providing specialised expertise and equipment throughout an operation. Depending on the squads and the fire department, the special operations firefighters may or may not be involved in firefighting operations.

The roles of special operations firefighters are self-explanatory based on the name of the squad. The HAZMAT squad, for example, is responsible for managing hazardous materials as well as fighting fires caused by hazardous materials. High-angle rescue squads are responsible for rescuing people from high places such as high-rise buildings and cable cars, and they are trained in rope rescue techniques. However, some fire departments combine multiple specialties into a single team. For instance, the FDNY's Squad Companies. They are special operations firefighters who respond to fires but are also called in for high angle, collapse, confined space, subway, and hazardous material emergencies. Another example is the McKinney Fire Department's TIFMAS squad. They are special operations firefighters that serve as wildland firefighters and as a disaster response squad.

Notes

References 

Firefighting
Rescue